Arkutino Beach is a beach extending 1.8 km on the east coast of False Bay, Livingston Island, Antarctica. The beach is situated on Rozhen Peninsula, and is bounded by Charity Glacier to the north, Barnard Point to the south, and Veleka Ridge to the east. It is snow-free in the summer.

The feature was named after the coastal lagoon of Arkutino in southeastern Bulgaria.

Location

See also
 Tangra Mountains
 Livingston Island
 List of Bulgarian toponyms in Antarctica
 Antarctic Place-names Commission

Maps
 L.L. Ivanov et al. Antarctica: Livingston Island and Greenwich Island, South Shetland Islands. Scale 1:100000 topographic map. Sofia: Antarctic Place-names Commission of Bulgaria, 2005.
 Antarctic Digital Database (ADD). Scale 1:250000 topographic map of Antarctica. Scientific Committee on Antarctic Research (SCAR). Since 1993, regularly upgraded and updated.
 L.L. Ivanov. Antarctica: Livingston Island and Smith Island. Scale 1:100000 topographic map. Manfred Wörner Foundation, 2017.

Notes

References
 Arkutino Beach. SCAR Composite Gazetteer of Antarctica
 Bulgarian Antarctic Gazetteer. Antarctic Place-names Commission. (details in Bulgarian, basic data in English)

External links
 Arkutino Beach. Copernix satellite image

Beaches of Livingston Island
Bulgaria and the Antarctic